University of the Potomac (formerly Potomac College) is a private for-profit university with campuses in Washington, DC; Falls Church, Virginia; and Chicago, Illinois. It offers Associate of Science, Bachelor of Science, Graduate, and advanced certification programs and is accredited by the Middle States Commission on Higher Education.

History
The University of the Potomac Board of Trustees announced its Interim President and CEO, Andrea Kemp-Curtis effective November 2021. Dr. Gardner was previously president of the university from May 2013 to September 2017 and December 2019 to November 2021.

In 2009 the institution was warned by its then-accrediting body, ACICS.  In 2010, Potomac was put on probation.  In 2011 it was again warned.

Potomac is owned by Linden East, LLC.

Academics
University of the Potomac’s programs are tailored to a working population.  Qualified students can earn degrees in as few as 18 months and all courses are offered online. Students can also choose a hybrid program, which allows them to take both online and on-campus classes.

The university has an open admissions policy.  Applicants who qualify are eligible for both Pell grants and federal student loans.

International program
University of the Potomac offers a five-year international BA/MBA Program under a partnership with University of Business and International Studies in Geneva, Switzerland.  The bachelor's degree is completed in the first 3.5 years and the MBA is completed after one additional year.

Locations

The university offers courses at all of its campus locations, as well as online.  The locations are easily accessible by public transportation, and the Washington, DC location is only 1 block from the McPherson Square Metro Station on the Silver, Orange, and Blue Lines. Students have the option to choose a completely online program, completely on campus, or a hybrid style featuring both online and on campus classes. International students attending University of the Potomac must complete at least 75% of their degree on campus.

References

External links
 Official website

Universities and colleges in Washington, D.C.
Private universities and colleges in Virginia
For-profit universities and colleges in the United States
Educational institutions established in 1991
Education in Fairfax County, Virginia
1991 establishments in Washington, D.C.